Qubadlı Şıxlı is a village in the municipality of Cəyirli in the Goychay Rayon of Azerbaijan.

References

Populated places in Goychay District